Realtime video can refer to:
 Videoconferencing
 Indeo, former name RealTime Video, a video codec developed by Intel in 1992 
 Real-time video editing